Arthur Leo Charbonneau (born August 20, 1939) was a Canadian politician. He served in the Legislative Assembly of British Columbia from 1991 to 1996, as a NDP member for the constituency of Kamloops.

References

1939 births
Living people
British Columbia New Democratic Party MLAs
Education ministers of British Columbia
Members of the Executive Council of British Columbia
Politicians from Regina, Saskatchewan
20th-century Canadian legislators